Reg Trigg (12 July 1916 – 22 April 2002) was an  Australian rules footballer who played with Fitzroy in the Victorian Football League (VFL).

Notes

External links 
		

1916 births
2002 deaths
Australian rules footballers from Victoria (Australia)
Fitzroy Football Club players